Istanbul Summit may refer to:

1999 Istanbul summit (6th OSCE summit)
2002 Istanbul summit (7th ECO summit)
2004 Istanbul summit (17th NATO summit)